Rincon del Tigre Airport  is an airport serving the village of Rincon del Tigre in the Santa Cruz Department of Bolivia.

See also

Transport in Bolivia
List of airports in Bolivia

References

External links 
OpenStreetMap - Ricon del Tigre
OurAirports - Ricon del Tigre

Airports in Santa Cruz Department (Bolivia)